The 258th Field Artillery Regiment or "Washington Greys" is a field artillery unit of the New York Army National Guard that traces its lineage from 1809 to present. Circa 1957–1966 it consisted of four battalions.

History
Predecessors of the 258th Field Artillery Regiment fought in the War of 1812, the Spanish–American War, the American Civil War, and World War I and World War II.  The 258th Field Artillery is one of only nineteen Army National Guard units with campaign credit for the War of 1812.

Early history

The regiment was formed on October 9, 1809 as the 4th Regiment, New York State Artillery, organized from existing companies. Their name, "Washington Greys", comes from the fact that this unit acted as escort to General George Washington at his first inauguration as president in New York City. It was redesignated on June 13, 1812 as the 3rd Regiment, New York State Artillery.The unit was brought into federal service for the War of 1812 in 1812, and again in 1814. In 1847, it was redesignated as the 8th Regiment, New York State Militia (NYSM).

American Civil War

The unit served three periods of federal service in the American Civil War. As the 8th NYSM, the unit was organized in April, 1861 for 90 days' service, leaving New York state for Washington, D.C., on the 20th and mustering in to federal service on the 26th. It served in the defenses of Washington, DC until July. The unit was part of Porter's 1st Brigade, Hunter's 2nd Division, McDowell's Army of Northeast Virginia at the First Battle of Bull Run on July 21, 1861. The 8th returned to New York City, mustering out there on August 2, 1861. Following redesignation as the 8th Regiment, New York National Guard, the unit was mustered in again on May 29, 1862, for 90 days' service. It served in the defenses of Washington, D.C., as part of the garrison of that city, and was mustered out of service on September 9, 1862. It was called up for a third time in June, 1863, for 30 days' service in response to Robert E. Lee's invasion of Pennsylvania in June of that year. It served in Harrisburg, Pennsylvania, as part of the garrison of that city and 1st Brigade, 1st Division, Dept. of the Susquehanna, and was mustered out of service on July 23, 1863.

The 8th also had an artillery battery known as "Varian's 1st Troop Washington Grays". This battery mustered into federal service on April 19, 1861 and left New York for Annapolis, Maryland. On May 18 moved near a lighthouse at Smith's Point on Chesapeake Bay. Outpost duty in Northern Virginia through June 17. Attached to Keyes' Brigade, Tyler's Division, McDowell's Army of Northeast Virginia, to July. Mustered out July 20, 1861, the day before the First Battle of Bull Run. The unit's guns served in the battle with Blenkers' Brigade, Miles' Division as "Brookwood's New York Battery" under Captain Charles Brookwood, manned by detachments from the 8th Militia and 29th New York Volunteer Infantry. The battery was federalized again with the remainder of the regiment in June–July, 1863 as above.

In August 1861 the detachments of the 8th NYSM and 29th NY Vols. that had served the 1st Troop's guns were reorganized as the 2nd New York Independent Battery, Light Artillery (Blenker's Battery). The unit served in Washington, D.C., until April 1862, operating in the Shenandoah Valley to August 1862, fighting in the Battle of Cross Keys and Second Battle of Bull Run. In early May 1863 the unit was in the Battle of Chancellorsville. After transferring three-year men to Battery I, 1st New York Light Artillery, the unit mustered out on June 13, 1863.

Spanish–American War through 1913
The 8th briefly returned to federal service in 1898 during the Spanish–American War as the 8th New York Volunteer Infantry Regiment, mustering in by May 19th and mustering out on November 3rd. It did not deploy outside the United States. In 1906 the 8th Infantry Regiment was reorganized and redesignated as the 8th Infantry Battalion. It was reorganized and redesignated 21 January 1908 as the 8th Infantry Regiment. It was then converted and redesignated 23 January 1908 as the 8th Artillery District, Coast Artillery Corps.

World War I
The 8th Artillery District was reorganized and redesignated 10 August 1914 as the 8th Coast Defense Command, Coast Artillery Corps, New York National Guard. In 1917 the unit relocated from Manhattan to the new Kingsbridge Armory in the Bronx. Mustered into Federal service 22 July 1917 at New York; drafted into Federal service 5 August 1917.  Companies of the 8th Coast Defense Command were reorganized and redesignated 22 January–1 February 1918 as elements of the 58th Artillery (Coast Artillery Corps), the Coast Defenses of Southern New York, and the Coast Defenses of Eastern New York. New York elements of the 58th Artillery (Coast Artillery Corps) demobilized 7 May 1919 at Camp Upton, New York; elements of the Coast Defenses of Southern New York in December 1918 at Fort Wadsworth, New York; and elements of the Coast Defenses of Eastern New York in December 1918 at Fort Totten, New York.

Interwar period
The former 8th Coast Defense Command was consolidated with the 8th Coast Defense Command, New York Guard, and reorganized in the New York National Guard as the 193rd Field Artillery with headquarters federally recognized 11 May 1921 at Bronx. It was redesignated as the 258th Field Artillery (155 mm gun) on 28 November 1921 and assigned to II Corps.

World War II
On 3 February 1941 the regiment was inducted into federal service and moved to Fort Ethan Allen, Vermont; assigned to 71st Field Artillery Brigade, VI Corps. Moved to Madison Barracks, NY on 2 June 1941; moved to Pine Camp, NY on 18 May 1942. On 8 February 1943 the regiment was broken up (triangularized) in accordance with an Army-wide reorganization. It became the 258th Field Artillery Group (former Headquarters & Headquarters Battery), 258th Field Artillery Battalion (former 1st Battalion) and the 991st Field Artillery Battalion (former 2nd Battalion). All were deployed to Europe. 

The 258th Field Artillery Group departed the New York port of embarkation on 22 January 1944, arrived in England on 28 January 1944 and moved to France on 8 July 1944. Moved into Holland on 16 September 1944 and Germany 19 November 1944. The unit was at Alsfeld, Germany in August 1945. Campaign credit includes the Normandy, Northern France, Rhineland, and Central Europe campaigns. Returned to Boston Port of Embarkation 24 September 1945 and inactivated the next day.

The 258th Field Artillery Battalion was a self-propelled unit equipped with twelve 155 mm M12 Gun Motor Carriages. It departed the New York port of embarkation on 22 January 1944, arrived in England on 28 January 1944 and moved to France on 2 July 1944. Campaign credit includes the Normandy, Northern France, Rhineland, and Central Europe campaigns. In August 1945 the unit was at Lehrbach, Germany. Returned to Boston port of embarkation 18 December 1945 and inactivated the next day.

The 991st Field Artillery Battalion departed the New York port of embarkation on 22 January 1944, arrived in England on 28 January 1944 and moved to France on 11 July 1944. It was attached to the 3rd Armored Division or VII Corps for most of the war, as a self-propelled unit equipped with twelve 155 mm M12 Gun Motor Carriages. Batteries were detached to support divisions in combat as necessary. Battery B of the 991st was credited with firing the first shells into Germany and Battery C was given credit for its role in the capture of Aachen. The 991st was also the first American unit to use captured 155 mm enemy shells. The Germans were using captured French Canon de 155mm GPF guns (German designation 15.5 cm K 418(f)), similar to the GPF-derived 155 mm gun M1918 on the M12 Gun Motor Carriage the 991st was armed with. The 991st also deployed a single pilot M40 Gun Motor Carriage with the 155 mm "Long Tom" gun. Campaign credit includes the Normandy, Northern France, Ardennes-Alsace (Battle of the Bulge), Rhineland, and Central Europe campaigns. The unit was in Allstedt, Germany in August 1945. Returned to Boston Port of Embarkation 15 November 1945 and inactivated the next day.

After World War II

In 1957 the battalion of the 258th FA at Kingsbridge Armory had all four batteries equipped with 105mm towed artillery pieces.  In 1959 all the units were switched to 155mm towed. At some time prior to 1962, the unit again changed to 8-inch howitzer towed.  Additionally, in 1962 one battery was upgraded to the Honest John Rocket.
 
1st Battalion (155mm towed), 2nd Bn (105mm towed), 3rd Bn (105mm towed), and the 4th Rocket/Howitzer Battalion armed with 8" Howitzer and Honest John Rocket were all located in the Kingsbridge Armory, Bronx, NY. They were part of the 42nd Infantry Division Artillery (DIVARTY). The 3rd Battalion was deactivated first; then in 1967 the 2nd Battalion, followed in 1973 by the 4th Battalion.

In 2004, B Battery (temporarily redesignated Company G 89th Military Police Brigade) commanded by CPT Seth Morgulas (now Colonel and commander of the 369th Sustainment Brigade) and C Battery commanded by CPT Andrew Espinoza deployed to Iraq in support of Operation Iraqi Freedom II/III. B Battery was awarded the Meritorious Unit Citation for its service. 

In 2008, the 1st Battalion, 258th Field Artillery was composed of three batteries and a support company. Battery A was located in New Windsor, New York. Battery B in Bronx, New York. Headquarters and Headquarters Battery was in Jamaica, New York and Company G, 427th BSB in Jamaica, NY. The battalion was equipped with the M119 105 mm towed howitzer. It was planned that the battalion would re-equip with the M777 155 mm towed howitzer in 2019, at Fort Sill, OK. 

Since 2001 the battalion has sent soldiers to both Operation Enduring Freedom and Operation Iraqi Freedom. It was part of the 27th Infantry Brigade Combat Team, part of the 42nd Infantry Division.

Distinctive unit insignia
 Description
A Gold color metal and enamel device 1 3/16 inches (3.02 cm) in height overall consisting of a shield blazoned: Gules, two bars Gray fimbriated Or in chief three mullets of the second (Gray) fimbriated of the third (Or). Attached below the shield a Gold scroll inscribed “PARATUS ET FIDELIS” in Red letters.
 Symbolism
The shield is the shield of George Washington modified by reversing the colors and using gray piped with gold, instead of silver, and giving a red shield for Artillery. The arms of the Father of our Country are not to be borne by any organization and the shield of the regiment is accordingly modified. The reason for this selection is that it is a tradition that one company of this regiment paraded as an escort to General Washington on the occasion of his inauguration as President on 30 April 1789, and in commemoration of that event, assumed the name of “Washington Greys” which it has borne to this date. It was then an Artillery organization and wore a gray uniform.
 Background
The distinctive unit insignia was originally approved for the 258th Field Artillery Regiment on 19 January 1925. It was redesignated for the 258th Field Artillery Battalion on 12 March 1954. It was redesignated for the 258th Artillery Regiment on 22 March 1962. The insignia was amended to add a motto on 18 October 1968. It was redesignated for the 258th Field Artillery Regiment on 31 July 1972.

Coat of arms
Blazon
 Shield: Gules, two bars Gray fimbriated Or in chief three mullets of the second (Gray) fimbriated of the third (Or).
 Crest: That for the regiments and separate battalions of the New York Army National Guard: On a wreath of the colors Or and Gules, the full-rigged ship “Half Moon” all Proper.
Motto PARATUS ET FIDELIS (Ready And Faithful).
 Symbolism
 Shield: The shield is the shield of George Washington modified by reversing the colors and using gray piped with gold, instead of silver, and giving a red shield for Artillery. The arms of the Father of our Country are not to be borne by any organization and the shield of the regiment is accordingly modified. The reason for this selection is that it is a tradition that one company of this regiment paraded as an escort to General Washington on the occasion of his inauguration as President on 30 April 1789, and in commemoration of that event, assumed the name of “Washington Greys” which it has borne to this date. It was then an Artillery organization and wore a gray uniform.
 Crest: The crest is that of the New York Army National Guard.
Background: The coat of arms was originally approved for the 258th Field Artillery Regiment on 19 January 1925. It was redesignated for the 258th Field Artillery Battalion on 12 March 1954. It was redesignated for the 258th Artillery Regiment on 22 March 1962. The insignia was redesignated for the 258th Field Artillery Regiment on 31 July 1972.

See also
 1st Battalion, 258th Field Artillery (United States)
 8th New York Volunteer Infantry Regiment - different Civil War unit with same number

References

Bibliography
 
 258th Field Artillery Regiment at The Institute of Heraldry

External links
 258th Field Artillery Association
  - 258th Field Artillery, Army Lineage Series

Military units and formations in New York (state)
Field artillery regiments of the United States Army
Field artillery regiments of the United States Army National Guard
Military units and formations established in 1809